Orange Sport was a Polish sports channel owned by Telekomunikacja Polska. It was launched on August 8, 2008 and shut down on December 31, 2016 due to low viewership.

External links
Official site

Defunct television channels in Poland
Sports television in Poland
Television channels and stations established in 2008
Television channels and stations disestablished in 2016